Jordon Sweet (born 2 February 1998) is an Australian rules footballer who plays for the Western Bulldogs in the Australian Football League (AFL). He was recruited by the Western Bulldogs with the 23rd draft pick in the 2018 AFL Rookie draft.

Early football
Sweet began his football career at Ingle Farm Junior Football Club in the inner north of Adelaide. He played from 2010-2011 in the Under 12s and 14 divisions, playing a total of 41 games with the club before moving to Tea Tree Gully Football Club, where he played 35 games in the Under 15s and Under 16s revisions.

AFL career
Sweet stayed behind other young ruckman Tim English in the pecking order of team selection. He got his chance to debut when main ruckman Stefan Martin was rested in the 5th round of the 2021 AFL season. On debut, Sweet collected 8 disposals and 31 hitouts. He was omitted the next week, but again returned in Round 8 when Martin was out with Achilles soreness. He kicked his first career goal in that game.

Statistics
 Statistics are correct to the end of round 16, 2022.

|- style="background-color: #EAEAEA"
! scope="row" style="text-align:center" | 2021
|
| 41 || 5 || 1 || 2 || 21 || 22 || 43 || 12 || 19 || 99 || 0.2 || 0.4 || 4.2 || 4.4 || 8.6 || 2.4 || 3.8 || 19.8 
|- style="background-color: #EAEAEA"
! scope="row" style="text-align:center" | 2022
|
| 41 || 5 || 1 || 0 || 19 || 22 || 41 || 8 || 22 || 127 || 0.2 || 0.0 || 3.8 || 4.4 || 8.2 || 1.6 || 4.4 || 25.4
|- class="sortbottom"
! colspan=3| Career
! 10
! 2
! 2
! 40
! 44
! 84
! 20
! 41
! 226
! 0.2
! 0.2
! 4.0
! 4.4
! 8.4
! 2.0
! 4.1
! 22.6
|}

References

External links

1998 births
Living people
Western Bulldogs players
Sportsmen from South Australia
Australian rules footballers from South Australia
North Adelaide Football Club players